Lin Cheng-yi  is a Taiwanese international footballer who plays as a defender for Kaohsiung County Taipower and the Taiwan national team.

References 

Living people
1987 births
Taiwanese footballers
Chinese Taipei international footballers
Taiwan Power Company F.C. players
Association football defenders
People from Hualien County